Haris is a first or given mythological Greek name, which means "grace"  or in Arabic Haris, which means "Guardian angel".  Notable people with the name include:

Haris Alagic (born 1995) Dutch singer
Haris Alexiou (born 1950) Greek singer
Haris Duljević (born 1993), Bosnian footballer
Haris Medunjanin (born 1985), Bosnian footballer
Haris Seferovic (born 1992), Swiss footballer
Haris Khan (born 1995), Pakistani cricketer
Haris Silajdžić (born 1945), former Bosniak member of the Presidency of Bosnia and Herzegovina
Haris Pašović (born 1961), Bosnian theatre and film director
Haris Sohail (born 1989), Pakistani cricketer
Haris Rauf, Pakistani cricketer
Mohammad Haris, Pakistani cricketer

References

Bosniak masculine given names
Bosnian masculine given names